The FIBA Africa Championship 1989 was hosted by Angola from December 16 to December 27, 1989.  The games were played in Luanda.  Angola won the tournament, its first African Championship, by beating Egypt in the final.  Both teams qualified for the 1990 FIBA World Championship as a result of their showing in this tournament.

Competing Nations
The following national teams competed:

Preliminary rounds

Group A

Day 1

Day 2

Day 3

Day 4

Day 5

Group B

Day 1

Day 2

Day 3

Day 4

Day 5

Knockout stage

Classification Stage

Final standings

Awards

External links
 FIBA Archive

B
1989 in African basketball
AfroBasket
International basketball competitions hosted by Angola
December 1989 sports events in Africa